Austin Powers: The Spy Who Shagged Me is a 1999 American spy comedy film directed by Jay Roach. It is the second installment in the Austin Powers film series, after International Man of Mystery. It stars franchise co-producer and writer Mike Myers as Austin Powers, Dr. Evil and Fat Bastard. The film also stars Heather Graham, Michael York, Robert Wagner, Seth Green, and Elizabeth Hurley. The film's title is a play on the James Bond film The Spy Who Loved Me (1977). The film centers on Dr. Evil returning again from cryostasis to strike at Powers from the past, using a time machine to remove Powers' charisma ("mojo") and deprive him of whatever qualities made him an effective secret agent so he can no longer interfere with Evil's plans.

The most commercially successful movie in the Austin Powers series, the film grossed around $312 million in worldwide ticket sales, taking more money during its opening weekend than the entire box office proceeds of its predecessor. It was nominated at the 72nd Academy Awards for Best Makeup (Michèle Burke and Mike Smithson). It is followed by Austin Powers in Goldmember (2002).

Plot
In 1999, British spy Austin Powers enjoys his honeymoon with his wife, Vanessa Kensington. Vanessa, in actuality a fembot controlled by Dr. Evil, attacks Powers, then self-destructs. Austin grieves briefly before realizing he is single again and can have sex without commitment. A NATO monitoring facility observes Dr. Evil's return from space; he then confronts his son Scott and starts a brawl on The Jerry Springer Show. At Dr. Evil's lair in Seattle, he is presented with a one-eighth-size clone of himself, whom he names Mini-Me.

Number 2 reveals their company purchased Starbucks, but Dr. Evil nonetheless unveils a plan to time travel back to the 1960s and steal Austin's mojo, the source of his sexual appeal. Dr. Evil and Mini-Me travel to 1969, meeting a younger Number 2 and Frau Farbissina. An obese "Scottish Guard", Fat Bastard, extracts Austin's mojo from his frozen body at the Ministry of Defence (MOD). British intelligence warns Austin that one of Dr. Evil's agents is after him, and during a photo shoot Ivana Humpalot seduces him, but at the last moment claims he is too sexy to kill. They have sex, but he discovers he has lost his mojo and is impotent.

The MOD sends Austin to 1969 using a time-travelling Volkswagen New Beetle. Austin arrives to a party in his London pad, and with the assistance of CIA agent Felicity Shagwell escapes an assassination attempt by Dr. Evil's operatives. Austin and Felicity are pursued by Mustafa, another of Dr. Evil's henchmen; when caught he reveals the existence of Dr. Evil's volcano lair. Before he can divulge its location, Mini-Me causes him to fall from a cliff.

Examining photographs from the crime scene, Austin identifies Fat Bastard as the perpetrator of the theft of his mojo. Fat Bastard presents Austin's mojo to Dr. Evil, who drinks some of it and has sex with Frau Farbissina. This results in awkwardness when Farbissina reveals she is pregnant immediately before Scott arrives through the time portal. Dr. Evil announces his latest plan — to hold the world ransom by threatening to destroy cities using a laser located on the Moon. Austin and Felicity get to know each other, but when Felicity propositions him for sex, he turns her down because of his lost mojo.

Under MOD instructions to implant a homing device into Fat Bastard, Felicity has sex with him, enabling her to plant the device in his anus. Fat Bastard forces it out of his bowels into a toilet, but a stool sample reveals traces of a vegetable that only grows on one Caribbean island. Austin and Felicity arrive on the island but are apprehended. They are put in a cell with a guard who is overcome when Felicity exposes her breasts. Dr. Evil and Mini-Me leave for the Moon to install the laser, pursued by Austin and Felicity on Apollo 11. At Dr. Evil's moon base, Austin battles Mini-Me, eventually flushing him into space. As Austin confronts Dr. Evil, Dr. Evil gives him a choice: save the world or Felicity, who is locked in a chamber with poison gas.

Felicity tells Austin to save the world and he succeeds, but Felicity dies. Before Austin can kill him, Dr. Evil suggests Austin use the time machine to save both Felicity and the world. Austin travels ten minutes into the past, meeting up with himself and saving the world and Felicity. Dr. Evil initiates the self-destruct mechanism of the moon base and escapes after throwing Austin's mojo into the air. Both Austins fail to catch it and it is destroyed. Felicity points out that all the things Austin has done show that he never lost his mojo. They escape through the time portal to 1999.

At Austin's pad, Fat Bastard attempts to assassinate Austin, but Felicity disarms him. Felicity and Austin throw a party. In 1969, Dr. Evil recovers Mini-Me from space and vows revenge. On The Jerry Springer Show, Scott learns he is the love child of Dr. Evil and Frau Farbissina. Austin returns to his pad to discover Felicity with the past Austin, who claims that since he and Austin are the same person, it is not cheating.

Cast

 Mike Myers as Austin Powers, Dr. Evil and Fat Bastard
 Heather Graham as Felicity Shagwell
 Michael York as Basil Exposition
 Robert Wagner as Number 2
 Rob Lowe as Young Number 2
 Mindy Sterling as Frau Farbissina
 Seth Green as Scott Evil
 Verne Troyer as Mini-Me
 Elizabeth Hurley as Vanessa Kensington
 Gia Carides as Robin Spitz-Swallows
 Will Ferrell as Mustafa
 Oliver Muirhead as British Colonel
 Clint Howard as Johnson Ritter
 Kristen Johnston as Ivana Humpalot
 Jeff Garlin as Cyclops
 Michael McDonald as NATO Soldier
 Burt Bacharach as Himself
 Elvis Costello as Himself
 Jerry Springer as Himself
 Steve Wilkos as Himself
 Rebecca Romijn as Herself
 Woody Harrelson as Himself
 Charles Napier as General Hawk
 Tim Robbins as Richard Nixon (The President)
 Willie Nelson as Himself
 Kevin Durand as Bazooka Marksman Joe
 Fred Willard as Mission Commander
 David Koechner as Co-Pilot
 Tony Jay as the Narrator
 Rachel Wilson as Woody Harrelson fan

Production

Title censorship
There were two variations of the posters; one of them asterisked out the middle of the offending word "shag". Other posters had named the film as Austin Powers 2. According to the Collins English Dictionary, the use of the word "shag" in the film's title helped to increase the word's acceptability, reducing its shock value and giving it a more jocular, relaxed connotation.

Singapore considered changing  the title to The Spy Who Shioked Me (shiok derives from the Malay word, syok, which means, "to feel good").

Release
The Spy who Shagged Me was a hit at the box office, landing the top position in its opening weekend grossing $54.9 million, more than the entire gross of its predecessor (the first sequel to achieve this), setting a record for a June opening and the biggest opening ever for a comedy. The film grossed $312 million worldwide.

Reception

On Rotten Tomatoes, the film has an approval rating of 52% based on 90 reviews, with an average rating of 6/10. The website's critics consensus reads, "Provides lots of laughs with Myers at the helm; as funny or funnier than the original." On Metacritic the film has a weighted average score of 59 out of 100, based on 34 critics, indicating "mixed or average reviews". Audiences polled by CinemaScore gave the film an average grade of "B+" on an A+ to F scale.

Soundtrack

The movie's soundtrack contains the 1999 hit "Beautiful Stranger" by Madonna. The song won a Grammy Award in 2000. Mike Myers appears as Austin Powers in the video, directed by Brett Ratner. Another single "Word Up!" by Mel B, was released on June 28, 1999. It peaked at number 13 on the UK Singles Chart.

Dr. Evil also sings a parody of Will Smith's popular 1997 cover of the Grover Washington Jr. classic "Just the Two of Us", referring in this case to his clone Mini-Me. The film's soundtrack had a rating of three stars at AllMusic.

Another single "American Woman" by Lenny Kravitz, was released as a single and was later included in the 1999 reissue of Kravitz's album 5. The cover reached the top 20 in Australia, Finland, Italy, New Zealand, and Spain, as well as number 26 in Canada and number 49 on the US Billboard Hot 100. Kravitz's version is slower and softer than the original, without the signature guitar solo; he later said to Randy Bachman that the reason why he skipped the lead guitar part was "I couldn't get the sound. I couldn't get the tone." The music video (directed by Paul Hunter) featured actress Heather Graham (who starred in The Spy Who Shagged Me); the original political themes of the song were largely replaced by sex appeal. In 1999, Kravitz and his band were joined by The Guess Who for a live performance of "American Woman" at the MuchMusic Video Awards. It was also used as the theme song of the Madusa monster truck in monster jam events.

Track listing
 "Beautiful Stranger" – Madonna
 "My Generation" – The Who (live at BBC)
 "Draggin' the Line" – R.E.M.
 "American Woman" – Lenny Kravitz
 "Word Up!" – Melanie B (credited as Melanie G)
 "Just the Two of Us (Dr. Evil Mix)" – Dr. Evil (Mike Myers)
 "Espionage" – Green Day
 "Time of the Season" – Big Blue Missile/Scott Weiland
 "Buggin'" – The Flaming Lips
 "Alright" – The Lucy Nation
 "I'll Never Fall in Love Again" – Burt Bacharach/Elvis Costello
 "Soul Bossa Nova (Dim's Space-A-Nova)" – Quincy Jones & His Orchestra

The soundtrack sold over one million copies in the United States and was certified Platinum. A second soundtrack was also released, entitled More Music From the Motion Picture.

Certifications

More Music track listing "Dialogue"
 "Austin Meets Felicity" – Film Dialogue
 Mustafa's Three Question Rule – Film Dialogue

"More Music" track listing
 "Am I Sexy?" – Lords of Acid
 "I'm a Believer" – The Monkees
 "Magic Carpet Ride" – Steppenwolf
 "American Woman" – The Guess Who
 "Get the Girl" – The Bangles
 "Bachelord Pad" (FPM Edit) – Fantastic Plastic Machine
 "Let's Get It On" – Marvin Gaye
 "Crash!" – Propellerheads
 "Time of the Season" – The Zombies
 "Dr. Evil" – They Might Be Giants
 "The Austin Powers Shagaphonic Medley" – George S. Clinton
 "Beautiful Stranger" (Calderone Radio Mix) – Madonna

In addition, a score album featuring cues from both George S. Clinton scores (tracks 1–7 from the first film, track 8 an arrangement of Quincy Jones's "Soul Bossa Nova," and tracks 9–16 from the second) was released.

Chart positions

Weekly charts

Year-end charts

See also
 Outline of James Bond

References

External links

 
 
 
 

2
1999 films
1999 action comedy films
1990s parody films
1990s spy comedy films
American parody films
American robot films
American sequel films
American space adventure films
American spy comedy films
Android (robot) films
1990s English-language films
Films about cloning
Films about time travel
Films directed by Jay Roach
Films produced by Demi Moore
Films scored by George S. Clinton
Films set in 1969
Films set in 1999
Films set in London
Films set in Seattle
Films shot in Los Angeles
Films shot in Washington (state)
Films with screenplays by Michael McCullers
Films with screenplays by Mike Myers
Moon in film
3 Arts Entertainment films
New Line Cinema films
1999 comedy films
Films produced by Suzanne Todd
1990s American films